Clapham Wood is a woodland area in Clapham, West Sussex, England, which Fortean authors and paranormal enthusiasts believe to be a locus of UFO sightings, Satanic cult activity, deaths, and lost or sick pets.

Clapham Wood mystery
According to an article by Nick Brownlow in the Fortean Times magazine, reports of UFO sightings and pets going missing or becoming ill in the area date back to the 1960s, as do reports of inexplicable nausea, sudden patches of grey mist, and sensations of being pushed or followed there.

Four bodies have been found in Clapham Wood. In June 1972, Police Constable Peter Goldsmith went missing, and his body was found hidden in a patch of thick bramble there some six months later. In August 1975, missing pensioner Leon Foster's body was found in the woods by a couple searching for a lost horse. In 1978, the missing Reverend Harry Neil Snelling's body was found by a Canadian tourist. In November 1981, the body of Jillian Matthews, a homeless individual with schizophrenia, was discovered; she had been raped and strangled.

In their 1987 book The Demonic Connection, authors Toyne Newton, Charles Walker and Alan Brown claimed that the woods were used for rituals by a Satanic cult calling itself "the Friends of Hecate". However, when journalist Will Storr investigated this claim for his book Will Storr vs the Supernatural, he found no evidence to back it up besides odd campfires and unfriendly locals. Writer Barry Stevens has also expressed skepticism, suggesting that Newton and his co-authors either invented the lurid paranormal stories for their book, or uncritically accepted urban legends and rumours.

References

External links
 Charles Walker interview
 Black Magic In Clapham and Sussex (Mysterious Britain & Ireland)

Culture in West Sussex
Forests and woodlands of West Sussex